Bruce Ray Christensen (born February 22, 1948) is a former Major League Baseball shortstop for the California Angels.  He was drafted by the Angels in the 17th round of the 1966 amateur draft.  In his only major league season, 1971, he got into a total of 29 games, 24 at shortstop, and was in the starting lineup 15 times.  Most of his starts came when All-Star shortstop Jim Fregosi was on the disabled list.  Christensen was called up to the Angels after hitting .309 in 82 games for the Salt Lake City Angels of the Pacific Coast League, and made his major league debut on July 17.

He was an excellent defensive player and an adequate hitter at the major league level.  At short he made only one error in 81 chances for a fielding percentage of .988, much higher than the league average.  He also participated in 13 double plays.  At the plate he was 17-for-63 (.270), and his six walks pushed his on-base percentage up to .333.  Not a power hitter, he had just one extra base hit (a double), three runs batted in, and four runs scored.

Christensen's best game as a hitter came on July 28, 1971, when he had three hits and a walk in a 5-1 victory over the Cleveland Indians at Cleveland Stadium.  He scored one run and drove in another.

Christensen has three children (Daniel, Sadie, and Nicholas) and lives in Moroni, Utah with his wife Laura.

References
1972 Baseball Register published by The Sporting News

External links
Baseball Reference
Retrosheet

Major League Baseball shortstops
Baseball players from Wisconsin
California Angels players
Salt Lake City Angels players
Phoenix Giants players
Sacramento Solons players
El Paso Sun Kings players
San Jose Bees players
Idaho Falls Angels players
Sportspeople from Madison, Wisconsin
1948 births
Living people
Chatsworth High School alumni